was a Japanese musical group consisting of 4 idol singers that was attached to Horiagency.  It was formed in 2000 and dissolved in 2002.

Summary 
During 1999, Ace File was known as ACE FILE'99.  The original group consisted of 4 members from Horiagency, Yoshikawa Mae, Aki Oosawa, Miyuki Sonota, Karin Ooyama.  Next year, in 2000, all members with the exception of Yoshikawa were replaced and the group was renamed to Ace File.  After becoming Ace File, the color white was chosen as the group image color.  Whenever they appeared on stages, they wore white clothes.

Members 
 Yoshikawa Mae (formerly in ACE FILE ’99)
 Nara Chiori (formerly an Oha Girl)
 Kushi Marina (formerly with CHECKICCO)
 Kudou Asagi (formerly an Oha Girl)

Discography

Singles 
WHITE STATION – 2001 – Ending theme to I My Me! Strawberry Eggs

Albums 
 I My Me! Strawberry Eggs Music Textbook ~ Original Soundtrack (8-22-2001)
 I My Me! Strawberry Eggs CD Drama Extracurricular Lesson (9-21-2001)

External links
Theppn

Japanese pop music groups